The Lupine Award is a literary prize given annually by the Maine Library Association to a living author or illustrator.  The prize can be given either for a book that is set in Maine or to an illustrator or author who was born in or who resides in Maine. The prize has been awarded annually since 1993. Since 2005, separate prizes have been awarded, one to a picture book and the other to a juvenile or young adult book.

Juvenile/Young Adult Winners

Picture Book Winners

References

American children's literary awards
Awards established in 1993